Autopia is the name of an IDW one-shot comic that based on the British science fiction television series Doctor Who. It is written by John Ostrander and illustrated by Kelly Yates. It was first printed in June 2009 and features the Tenth Doctor and companion Donna Noble.

Synopsis
The Doctor is attempting to land the TARDIS on the planet Autopia, however he has difficulty in passing the barrier that is protecting the planet. After breaking through the barrier, he and Donna decide to take a look.

The planet is perfect and the Doctor starts to wonder about a mission referred to as the Chronos Mission. He explains to Donna that the mission included five sentients who, like them, passed the barrier to invite the Autopians to rejoin the Universe. Inside, they discover robots everywhere. They perform all tasks.

After forcing a robot to take the two of them to its mistress, the Doctor finds that there's nothing to do on the planet as, with the help of the robots, everything is perfect. The Doctor begs to differ, stating that everything is stagnant. He then finds out the five sentients were killed on arrival to the planet. The mistress informs them that all intruders die and that they are no exception.

They are placed in the solar furnace, there to be incinerated. As the solar furnace begins to heat up, the Doctor talks to the robot. Donna names it Sam, after her cat. Sam is aware that what he is doing is morally wrong and wishes that he could stop it. Seconds before their death, Sam finally gives in and turns off the machine. Sam realises that he's committed so many of these crimes and asks the Doctor to end his life. Donna asks the Doctor to just upgrade him instead, however the Doctor tells her that all the robots are linked and that by giving one freedom, he will be giving them all freedom, and that that may have a catastrophic effect on the culture of Autopia.

The Doctor gives in and decides to upgrade him and hours later, Sam finds himself able to ponder things that were before prohibited. He realises that he is not just a robot. He is a slave. Things get worse as all of the robots decide to take revenge by herding up the Autopians and preparing for their deaths. The Doctor makes Sam remember the lesson about killing being morally wrong and he understands. He releases them and promises to better his people.

Donna reckons that the Autopians and Sam's people should work together and create a leisure planet, thus improving the culture of the planet and giving them something to do. The Doctor is stunned by how amazing the idea is and they return later for a quick sunbathe.

See also
Tenth Doctor comic stories

References

Comics based on Doctor Who
One-shot comic titles
Tenth Doctor stories
IDW Publishing titles